Samina Ali is an American author and activist born in India. Her debut novel, Madras on Rainy Days, won the Prix du Premier Roman Etranger award from France and was a finalist for the PEN/Hemingway Award in Fiction.

Career
She has served as the curator of Muslima: Muslim Women’s Art and Voices, a global, virtual exhibition for the International Museum of Women (IMOW), now part of Global Fund for Women. 

She is the co-founder of American Muslim feminist organization Daughters of Hajar.  

In 2017, she held a public intervention titled What does the Quran really say about a Muslim woman's hijab? at the Tedx of the University of Nevada, explaining the prurient basis of the hijab and the prohibition of the wearing of a bra by Muslim women. By 2020, the video had been viewed more than 8 million times.

She is a blogger for The Huffington Post and Daily Beast.

Bibliography
 Madras on Rainy Days, Farrar, Straus and Giroux, 2004,

Honors and awards
In 2004, Samina received the Rona Jaffe Foundation Writers' Award in fiction. One year later, Madras on Rainy Days was awarded the Prix du Premier Roman Etranger award in 2005, and was a finalist for the PEN/Hemingway Award in fiction.

In July 2004, Madras on Rainy Days was chosen as a best debut novel of the year by Poets & Writers magazine, and she was featured on the cover in July/August 2004 issue.

References

External links
 

Year of birth missing (living people)
Living people
Writers from Hyderabad, India
American people of Telugu descent
Indian emigrants to the United States
University of Oregon alumni
University of Minnesota alumni
Islamic fiction writers
21st-century American novelists
21st-century American women writers
Rona Jaffe Foundation Writers' Award winners
American women writers of Indian descent
American women novelists
American novelists of Indian descent